Mount Phillips is a mountain on Vancouver Island, British Columbia, Canada, located  southeast of Gold River and  southeast of Mount McBride.

See also
 Phillips Ridge
 List of mountains of Canada

References

Vancouver Island Ranges
One-thousanders of British Columbia
Nootka Land District